Hypostomus brevis is a species of catfish in the family Loricariidae. It is native to South America, where it is known from the Paraná River basin in Brazil. The species reaches 7.4 cm (2.9 inches) SL and is believed to be a facultative air-breather.

Taxonomy
The fish was first formally described by John Treadwell Nichols in 1919, as a species of Plecostomus; the type specimen was collected from the Mata Atlântica bioregion in São Paulo. The type is held at the American Museum of Natural History. The taxon was transferred to the genus Hypostomus in 1980 by Isaäc J. H. Isbrücker.

References

Hypostominae
Freshwater fish of Brazil
Fish described in 1919
Taxa named by John Treadwell Nichols